Mevo Hama is an Israeli settlement organized as a kibbutz in the Golan Heights. The settlement was established as a kibbutz after Israel occupied the area in the Six Day War in 1967.

The international community considers Israeli settlements in the Golan Heights illegal under international law, but the Israeli government disputes this.

History
The second Israeli settlement established in the Golan after the 1967 Six-Day War, it was built on a Syrian military base called "Emrit Ez Edeen", from which the Syrians had fired at the kibbutzim on the border (Ein Gev and HaOn). In January 1968, several members of the surrounding kibbutzim gathered and decided to establish a new settlement in the area and in September had settled the ruins of the base. They were joined in 1971 by several youth groups from Israel, Australia and England. The name of the settlement, meaning The Gateway of, or Approach to, the Hot Springs, referring to nearby Hamat Gader, was given to it by author Mattityahu Shalem.

See also
Israeli-occupied territories

References

Kibbutzim
Kibbutz Movement
Populated places established in 1968
Golan Regional Council
Israeli settlements in the Golan Heights
Populated places in Northern District (Israel)
1968 establishments in the Israeli Military Governorate